Phyllis Bertha Mabel Hetzel (10 June 1918 – 6 January 2011) was a British civil servant and university administrator. Her early career was in the civil service, serving in the Board of Trade, Department of Economic Affairs, Ministry of Technology, and the Department of Trade and Industry. She then began a second career in university administration, and served as President of Lucy Cavendish College, Cambridge from 1979 to 1984.

References

1918 births
2011 deaths
British civil servants
Academics of the University of Cambridge
Women heads of universities and colleges
Presidents of Lucy Cavendish College, Cambridge